Loxophlebia crocata is a moth of the subfamily Arctiinae. It was described by Gottlieb August Wilhelm Herrich-Schäffer in 1854. It is found in French Guiana and Rio de Janeiro, Brazil.

References

 

Loxophlebia
Moths described in 1854